WYRD-FM (106.3 MHz), known on-air as 106-3 WORD, The Upstate's Talk Station, is a news/talk-formatted radio station in the Greenville-Spartanburg area of Upstate South Carolina. The Audacy, Inc. outlet is licensed by the FCC to Simpsonville, South Carolina, and broadcasts at with an ERP of 25 kW. Until February 24, 2014, it simulcast with WYRD (1330 AM) in Greenville and WORD (950 AM) in Spartanburg (who flipped to ESPN Radio). Its studios are in Greenville and its transmitter is located east of Five Forks.

"106-3 WORD" carries local programs The Tara Show (with Tara Servatius), Vince Coakley, and Charlie James along with syndicated programming including Dana Loesch and The Mark Levin Show.

History
106.3 originally signed on July 10, 1989, as WNMX in Newberry with a 6,000 watt signal. The station featured an adult contemporary format under the name "Mix 106". Over time, the station adjusted itself toward CHR under the name "Hot Mix 106.3", with a light dose of alternative rock music. It was the intent to move the station into the Columbia radio market, but the plans to do so never materialized. Ratings for the station during this time were extremely poor. By the end of 1993, WNMX had changed to urban Contemporary and had boosted the signal to its present 25,000 watts, with little change in audience or advertising revenue.

In 1994, WNMX's format was changed again to country (with a musical lean toward classic country) under the handle "Big Bubba 106.3". For a time, the station actually did very well, but listenership started to drop as the audience started to drift back to the area's other country stations. In early 1995, WNMX was issued a cease and desist letter from WBUB, another country station in Charleston that was using the "Bubba" moniker and had trademarked the name in South Carolina. WNMX then changed its name to "Dixie 106.3" under the WDXZ callsign, but kept the format.

By 1996, WDXZ was in serious trouble as the ratings had bottomed out as well as problems with advertising support from the community. The station went off the air for a few months, which during that time was reorganized. It returned to the air in early September, but with a bare-bones staff. Eventually, it entered into a local marketing agreement (LMA) with a church group that took the station to a southern gospel format. Although it had a small, but loyal audience, the station suffered through several major setbacks and after two years, the station shut down.

In late 1999, the station signed back on the air under new ownership as WGVC, adopting a satellite-fed Jammin' Oldies format under the name "Groovin' 106.3".

In 2002, WGVC's city of license was changed to Simpsonville which paved the way for the station to be moved into the Greenville-Spartanburg radio market. WGVC was then sold to Barnstable Broadcasting, which at the time also owned rock stations WROQ and WTPT in the market. The format was changed to traditional oldies under the name "Oldies 106-3" and slogan "Motown, Soul, and Great Rock 'n Roll".

In 2005, Barnstable sold its Greenville-Spartanburg radio properties to Entercom Communications (forerunner to Audacy, Inc.). In order to comply with FCC ownership rules, Entercom sold the WOLI/WOLT simulcast and moved the contemporary Christian-country hybrid format that both stations over to WGVC, relaunching it as "106.3 The Walk", although ratings did not improve on the unified signal.

In late November 2006, a computerized "countdown" was broadcast on 106.3. The countdown lasted about a week. Its purpose was to count down until a new station would emerge. During the countdown, some various phrases and quotes from many sources (like movies and music) were played every 30 seconds for the duration. The new format was Greenstone Media's female-oriented talk, known only as "106.3 WGVC".

On August 6, 2007, it was confirmed that Greenstone Media, the main provider for WGVC's programming, would cease operations on August 17, 2007. Then on August 18, the station started playing a satellite feed of various genres of music, including rock from the 1970s and 1980s ("106.3 The Big Hair"), boy band music ("Backstreet 106.3"), a mix of rap and hip hop music, leaning towards old school rap ("Booty 106.3"), country music ("Cryin' Country 106.3"), and even Christmas music ("Santa 106.3").

On August 20, 2007, at 12:00 noon ET, a new radio station emerged, called "Charlie FM" with an adult hits format. The first song played was "What I Like About You" by The Romantics. The station played music commercial-free for the first week.  Since the format change to "Charlie", the station localized the sound with a variety of drop-ins that reference landmarks, roads, quirks, folk-lore for the region.

On June 13, 2008, Charlie FM's programming was abruptly dropped, replaced with that of WORD News Radio, which had previously only broadcast on AM, leaving the station to abandon music altogether after nineteen years. No reasoning was ever officially announced, but it is believed that Entercom was worried that the adult hits format would hurt its sister stations, especially WSPA-FM and WROQ.  The switch also makes up for the poor signals generated by WYRD-AM and WORD-AM at night, when the stations have to cut their power and go directional.  The adult hits format is now heard on W258CB, which is not owned by Entercom.

After the sale by Barnstable, 106.3, never managed to garner the ratings or success it did prior to Entercom Communications' decision to drop its oldies format, until it became simulcasting the talk format.  The addition of 106.3 to WYRD and WORD helped the franchise to finish in the top 3 12+ in fall 2008.

In November 2019 WYRD-FM began simulcasting on translator W270AM (101.5 FM) in Anderson.

On March 6, 2023, Audacy announced that WYRD-FM and WSPA-FM would swap formats and call signs beginning March 28. The move is intended to put WYRD-FM's programming on the larger 98.9 signal, a signal that reaches Asheville, North Carolina, while allowing WSPA-FM to maintain its focus on Greenville and Spartanburg counties on 106.3.

References

External links

YRD-FM
Radio stations established in 1989
1989 establishments in South Carolina
Audacy, Inc. radio stations
Simpsonville, South Carolina
News and talk radio stations in the United States